This is a list of notable South Korean exchange-traded funds.

All ROK-based ETFs, as of July 2012

KODEX ETFs are managed by Samsung Investments.
TIGER ETFs are managed by Miraeasset Investment Management.
KOSEF ETFs are managed by Woori Asset Management.

Market Index ETFs
 KODEX 200
 TIGER 200
 KOSEF 200
 KODEX Leverage
 TIGER Leverage
 KODEX Inverse
 TIGER Inverse

Sector-based ETFs
 KODEX Automobile
 KODEX Banks
 KODEX Construction
 KODEX Core Consumer
 KODEX Energy & Chemicals
 KODEX Insurance
 KODEX Securities
 KODEX Semiconductors
 KODEX Shipbuilding
 KODEX Steels
 KODEX Transportation
 TIGER Semiconductors
 TIGER Banks
 KOSEF IT
 KOSEF Banks

Style ETFs
 KODEX Samsung Group
 KODEX Sunlight
 TIGER Green
 TIGER Pure
 TIGER Mid-cap
 TIGER Samsung Group
 TIGER Hyundai Group+
 TIGER LG Group+
 KOSEF Large-cap
 KOSEF Mid-cap

Overseas ETFs
 KODEX China H tracking HSCEI
 KODEX Brazil tracking Brazil Titans 20 ADR Index
 KODEX Japan tracking TOPIX 100
 TIGER Latin tracking The Bank of New York Mellon Latin 35 ADR Index
 TIGER BRICs tracking The Bank of New York Mellon BRIC Select ADR Index
 TIGER NASDAQ100
 TIGER S&P500

Commodity
 KODEX Gold
 KODEX Silver
 KODEX Copper
 KODEX Soybean
 TIGER Crude Oil
 TIGER Agriculture
 TIGER Metals
 TIGER Precious Metals

Bond
 KODEX Treasury Bond

See also
List of exchange-traded funds

South Korean